A red panda is a small mammal native to the eastern Himalayas and southwestern China.

Red Panda can also refer to:
Red Panda (acrobat) (born 1970/1971), Chinese-American acrobat
Red Panda Records, a record label active in the 2000s
Red Panda Adventures, a Canadian radio drama

See also